Nematopogon distinctus is a moth of the Adelidae family or fairy longhorn moths. It was described by Yasuda in 1957. It is found in Japan.

The wingspan is 19–21 mm.

References

Moths described in 1957
Adelidae
Moths of Japan